The 2016 Senior Bowl was an all-star college football exhibition game featuring players from the 2015 NCAA Division I FBS football season, and prospects for the 2016 Draft of the professional National Football League (NFL). The game concluded the post-season that began on December 19, 2015. It was sponsored by Reese's Peanut Butter Cups and is officially known as the Reese's Senior Bowl.

The game was played on January 30, 2016, at 1:30 p.m. CST, at Ladd–Peebles Stadium in Mobile, Alabama, between "North" and "South" teams. Coverage of the event was provided on the NFL Network.

Rosters

North Team

South Team

Game summary

Scoring summary

Statistics

References

Senior Bowl
Senior Bowl
Senior Bowl
Senior Bowl